David Minkin is an American magician and an International Champion of Close-Up Magic.  He co-starred in the documentary film, Magicians: Life In The Impossible released in 2017 in limited theaters and on Netflix. Minkin was also a magician cast member on the MTV series Room 401 produced by Ashton Kutcher, and a co-star of the television show "Magic Outlaws" on the Travel Channel with fellow magicians Chris Korn and Ben Seidman.  Among Minkin's other television appearances was a segment that aired on American Idol, which was filmed in Los Angeles with the show's contestants visiting the Magic Castle.

Career
In 2007, Minkin won First Place in the close-up category of the International Brotherhood of Magicians' annual Convention in Reno, Nevada.

Minkin has an ongoing magic and wine tasting show in Hollywood and in Anaheim, called "Magic and Wine:  An Evening of Enchantment".  Now in its eleventh year, it is the longest-running one-man magic show in Los Angeles.  In 2014, it was voted the "Best Magical Date Night" in Los Angeles by LA Weekly.

Sources 
 Travel Channel's Mikey Roe searches for America's best late-night eateries in new 'Feed the Beast' series
 The Hollywood Reporter Reviews The Film, Magicians: Life In The Impossible

External links 
 
 Los Angeles Magic Show
 David Minkin Video

References

American magicians
Living people
Place of birth missing (living people)
Year of birth missing (living people)